This is an incomplete list of Maccabiah medalists in basketball from 1932 to 2005.



Men

Women 

 
 
Maccabiah
Basketball
Maccabiah